The 26th Independent Spirit Awards, honoring the best independent films of 2010, were presented on February 26, 2011. The nominations were announced on November 30, 2010. The ceremony was hosted by Joel McHale.

Winners and nominees

{| class="wikitable"
! Best Feature
! Best Director
|-
| Black Swan
 127 Hours
 Greenberg
 The Kids Are All Right
 Winter's Bone
| Darren Aronofsky – Black Swan
 Danny Boyle – 127 Hours
 Lisa Cholodenko – The Kids Are All Right
 Debra Granik – Winter's Bone
 John Cameron Mitchell – Rabbit Hole
|-
! Best Male Lead
! Best Female Lead
|-
| James Franco – 127 Hours
 Ronald Bronstein – Daddy Longlegs
 Aaron Eckhart – Rabbit Hole
 John C. Reilly – Cyrus
 Ben Stiller – Greenberg
| Natalie Portman – Black Swan
 Annette Bening – The Kids Are All Right
 Greta Gerwig – Greenberg
 Nicole Kidman – Rabbit Hole
 Jennifer Lawrence – Winter's Bone
 Michelle Williams – Blue Valentine
|-
! Best Supporting Male
! Best Supporting Female
|-
| John Hawkes – Winter's Bone
 Samuel L. Jackson – Mother and Child
 Bill Murray – Get Low
 John Ortiz – Jack Goes Boating
 Mark Ruffalo – The Kids Are All Right
| Dale Dickey – Winter's Bone
 Ashley Bell – The Last Exorcism
 Allison Janney – Life During Wartime
 Daphne Rubin-Vega – Jack Goes Boating
 Naomi Watts – Mother and Child
|-
! Best Screenplay
! Best First Screenplay
|-
| Stuart Blumberg and Lisa Cholodenko – The Kids Are All Right
 Debra Granik and Anne Rosellini – Winter's Bone
 Nicole Holofcener – Please Give
 David Lindsay-Abaire – Rabbit Hole
 Todd Solondz – Life During Wartime
| Lena Dunham – Tiny Furniture
 Diane Bell – Obselidia
 Nik Fackler – Lovely, Still
 Robert Glaudini – Jack Goes Boating
 Dana Adam Shapiro and Evan M. Wiener – Monogamy
|-
! Best First Feature
! Best Documentary Feature
|-
| Get Low
 Everything Strange and New
 The Last Exorcism
 Night Catches Us
 Tiny Furniture
| Exit Through the Gift Shop
 Marwencol
 Restrepo
 Sweetgrass
 Thunder Soul
|-
! Best Cinematography
! Best Foreign Film
|-
| Matthew Libatique – Black Swan
 Adam Kimmel – Never Let Me Go
 Jody Lee Lipes – Tiny Furniture
 Michael McDonough – Winter's Bone
 Harris Savides – Greenberg
| The King's Speech • United Kingdom Kisses • Ireland
 Mademoiselle Chambon • France
 Of Gods and Men • France
 Uncle Boonmee Who Can Recall His Past Lives • Thailand
|}

Films with multiple nominations and awards

Special awards

John Cassavetes AwardDaddy Longlegs
 The Exploding Girl
 Lbs.
 Lovers of Hate
 Obselidia

Truer Than Fiction Award
Jeff Malmberg – Marwencol
 Ilisa Barbash and Lucien Castaing-Taylor – Sweetgrass
 Lynn True and Nelson Walker III – Summer Pasture

Piaget Producers Award
Anish Savjani – Meek's Cutoff
 In-Ah Lee – Au Revoir Taipei
 Adele Romanski – The Myth of the American Sleepover

Someone to Watch Award
Mike Ott – Littlerock
 Hossein Keshavarz – Dog Sweat
 Laurel Nakadate – The Wolf Knife

Robert Altman Award
 Please Give – Nicole Holofcener, Jeanne McCarthy, Ann Guilbert, Rebecca Hall, Catherine Keener, Amanda Peet, Oliver Platt, Lois Smith, and Sarah Steele

References

External links
 2011 Awards at IMDb
 Official ceremony at YouTube

2010
Independent Spirit Awards